Davit Aghajanyan  (born on March 5, 1992), is an Armenian actor and model. He is known for his role as Tigran on Full House.

Artistry

Influences
Aghajanyan has listed Leonardo DiCaprio, Al Pacino, Robert De Niro and Jack Nicholson as his biggest influences.

Filmography

Discography

Singles

As featured artist

External links

References

1982 births
Living people
Male actors from Yerevan
Armenian male models
Models from Yerevan
21st-century Armenian male actors